Enterovibrio calviensis is a halophilic and facultatively oligotrophic bacterium species from the genus of Enterovibrio which has been isolated from sea water from the Bay of Calvi from the Mediterranean Sea in France.

References 

Vibrionales
Bacteria described in 2002